Letná is a hill overlooking Prague historic centre and Vltava River just besides Prague Castle. It neighbours Stromovka, the largest park in Prague. The hill belongs to Holešovice and Bubeneč quarters of Prague 7.

The main part of Letná is Letná Plain, a large empty plain and Letná Park  popular for summer strolls and informal sports (inline skating and jogging being the most popular here). Several rock concerts took place here, Michael Jackson (1996), Rolling Stones (2003) both with an over 120,000 audience.

Due to its position it used to be the venue for the largest Stalin statue in Europe. The statue was torn down in the 1960s and the Prague Metronome now occupies the site.

The football stadium of AC Sparta Prague, Generali Arena, is also located here.

Geography of Prague
Prague 7